Belvedere is a Neoclassical country house located at Strandvejen 407 in Klampenborg, Gentofte Municipality, some 15 kilometres north of central Copenhagen, Denmark. It was listed by the Danish Heritage Agency in the Danish registry of protected buildings and places on 3 January 1989.

History
 
The property was originally a copyhold (arvefæste) under Christiansholm. The original Belvedere was built in 1842. The house was adapted for Peter von Scholten in 1848. He had just returned from the Danish West Indies where he had served as governor-general and emancipated slavery immediately prior to his departure from the islands on 14 July 1848. Peter von Scholten was also the owner of a property at Bredgade 45 in Copenhagen. His wife Lise died in 1949 and a few years later he moved to Altona where he lived with his daughter and son-in-law until his death in 1854.

 
One of Belvedere's later owners was the financier and industrialist Isaac Wulff Heyman. He commissioned the architect Henrik Steffens Sibbern to adapt the building in 1870.

The property was purchased by Ilva-founder Hans Jørgen Linde in 1989. The house was subsequently put through a comprehensive renovation. It received an award from Gentofte Municipality in 1994. In 2011, Belvedere was purchased by Axcel-Managing Partner  Christian Frigast.

Architecture
The house has widen siding. It  has a central projection topped by a verenda on the first floor.

References

External links

 Architecturaql renderings in the Danish National Art Library

Houses completed in 1842
Listed buildings and structures in Gentofte Municipality
Houses in Gentofte Municipality